The Khash River (or Khash Rud River) is a river in Afghanistan.

The Khash rises in the southern part of Ghor Province on the southern slopes of Siah-Koh (Black Mountain), and flows southwest towards the towns of Delaram, Khash, and Zaranj in Nimruz Province. In flood, it reaches the Hamun Lake, but it is generally exhausted in irrigation.

References

External links
Afghanistan is from 1894 to 1912

Rivers of Afghanistan